John Maiben (February 13, 1898 - July 28, 1969) was "one of America's top jockeys during the 1920s" in the sport of Thoroughbred horse racing who won the 1926 Preakness Stakes, run that year as the first leg of the U.S. Triple Crown series.

Maiben was a late comer to the professional jockey trade, winning his first race at age 23 in 1922 at Thorncliffe Park Raceway in Toronto, Canada. He retired from riding in 1937 but remained in the industry as a racetrack official. In 1953 he was the presiding steward at Playfair Race Course in Spokane, Washington.

References

1898 births
1969 deaths
American jockeys
People from Mount Pleasant, Utah
Sportspeople from Utah